Pippi may refer to:

 Pippi Longstocking, the main character in an eponymous series of children's books by the Swedish author Astrid Lindgren
 Pippi, a character in the video game Mother
 The original Japanese name of the Pokémon Clefairy
 Damiano Pippi (born 1971), Italian volleyball player
 Pippi Zornoza (born 1978), American artist

See also
 Pippy (disambiguation)
 Pipi (disambiguation)